Fourmile Creek is a tributary of Lake Erie in Erie County, Pennsylvania, United States.

Course 
Fourmile Creek starts in Greene Township, immediately north of Pennsylvania Route 8. It flows northwest, with its valley getting deeper as it flows onwards. After several miles, it crosses under Interstate 90 and exits Greene Township, entering Harborcreek Township. At this point, the creek turns northwards and its valley continues to get deeper. After some distance, the valley gets shallower and the creek flows under Pennsylvania Route 290. It turns northwest and heads along the border between Harborcreek Township and Erie, eventually entering Erie. Upon entering Erie, it continues northwest, passing through the Lawrence Park Golf Club and entering Lake Erie.

Hydrology
The pH of Fourmile Creek ranges between 6 and 9. The salinity ranges from 0.1 parts per trillion to 0.3 parts per trillion. The total concentration of dissolved solids ranges from 180 to 500 parts per million. In 1982, the concentration of sodium in the creek ranged from 2.91 to 40.8 milligrams per liter at two sites. In the same year, the concentration of magnesium ranged from 2.9 to 14.2 milligrams per liter at two sites. The calcium concentration ranged from 29.3 to 134.5 milligrams per liter at two sites. The concentration of phosphates ranged from 0 to 0.55 milligrams per liter at two sites.

The discharge ranges from 1400 cubic centimeters per second in times of drought to 91,000 cubic centimeters per second during floods. The conductivity of the creek ranges from 274 micro-siemens to 747 micro-siemens.

In a list of 22 tributaries of Lake Erie compiled in a Strategic Action Plan, Fourmile Creek was ranked as the fourth-lowest in water quality. There are few cases of nonpoint source pollution in the upper reaches of the creek.

There are two dams on Fourmile Creek. One is located in the Lawrence Park Golf Course and the other is located south of Station Road. There is also a block of concrete in the stream that functions as a third dam.

A stream in the watershed of Fourmile Creek received sewage discharges for at least 20 years in the 1900s.

Geology and Geography
There is one waterfall on Fourmile Creek.

There are granite formations along the upper reaches of Fourmile Creek. Sheets of porphyry are mixed in with the granite. The shale-containing Belt formation occupies parts of the creek's watershed. There is a large mass of rhyolite located near the creek.

There is slide rock in the valley.

History
Since 2007, improvements have been undertaken to improve steelhead spawning in Fourmile Creek and provide better fishing access. As of 2011, two aluminum fishways have been added to allow steelhead trout to bypass river obstacles and improve access to their spawning grounds. In 2012, a golf course adjacent to these improvements finalized legal easements granting public access to the fishways via their private property.

Biology
The pathogenic Aeromonas veronii  bacteria has been observed in Fourmile Creek. Benthic macroinvertebrates live in the upper reaches of the creek. Six species of mayflies were observed on the creek in the late 1970s and early 1980s. They are Paraleptophlebia strigula, Paraleptophlebia debilis, Habrophlebiodes americana, Baetis tricaudatus, Baetus flavistriga, and Ameletus ludens.

Pine trees grow densely in the valley in the upper reaches of Fourmile Creek.

See also 
 List of rivers of Pennsylvania
 Twelvemile Creek
 Twentymile Creek

References 

Rivers of Pennsylvania
Tributaries of Lake Erie
Rivers of Erie County, Pennsylvania